Billy V. Koen (born March 2, 1938) is professor emeritus, Department of Mechanical Engineering, The University of Texas at Austin where he has taught for over 41 years. Koen is a nuclear engineer, author, and innovator in engineering methods and education.

Life, research, and selected publications

Billy Koen received his ScD (1968) and his MS (1962) in nuclear engineering from the Massachusetts Institute of Technology. He received a BA in Chemistry and BS in Chemical Engineering from The University of Texas at Austin (1960 and 1961) and Diplôme d’Ingénieur en Génie Atomique from L’Institut National des Sciences et Techniques Nucléaires, Saclay, France (1963).

He was a consultant to the French Atomic Energy Commission (1971-1972 and 1976-1977).  Billy Koen was a visiting professor at the Tokyo Institute of Technology (東京工業大学) (1994, 1998-1999, and 2001).  He is a fellow of the American Nuclear Society.  Koen has held numerous offices in the American Society for Engineering Education (ASEE), including Vice-President for Public Affairs. Professor Koen is a Fellow of ASEE, and has received several awards including the Chester F. Carlson award for innovation, the W. Leighton Collin’s award for service to engineering education, and the Centennial Medallion.

In nuclear engineering and artificial intelligence (AI), Koen pioneered the use of has AI in solving complex reactor safety issues and has overseen the research of a large number of graduate students. Representative publications:
 Hansen, K.F., Koen, B.V., Little, W.W., "Stable Numerical Solutions of the  Reactor Kinetics Equations, "Nuc. Sci. &   Eng., 22, 51-59 (1965). 
 Koen, B.V., "Méthodes Nouvelles Pour L'Evaluation de la Fiabilité: Reconnaissance des Formes," Commissariat à L'Energie Atomique, Rapport CEA-4368, Juin, 1972, (English Translation: "New Methods for the Evaluation of Reliability: Pattern Recognition").
 Macdonald, J.L., Koen, B.V., "Application of Artificial Intelligence Techniques to Digital Computer Control of Nuclear Reactors," Nuc. Sci. & Eng., Vol. 56, No. 2, Feb. 1975, pp. 14251

In 1969, Koen introduced to engineering education the self-paced Personalized System of Instruction (PSI or Keller Plan) as an alternative teaching method. In 2000, he adapted it to a web-based class. Representative publications:
 Koen, B.V., "Self-Paced Instruction for Engineering Students," Eng. Educ.,  Vol. 60, No. 7, March, 1970.
 Koen, Billy V., "Determining Unit Structure in a PSI Course," Event 1725, American  Society for Engineering Education Annual Meeting, June 19–22, 1972.
 Koen, Billy V., Heger, A. Sharif, "Evaluation of an Introductory Self-Paced Nuclear Course - Twenty Two Years Later," Transactions of the American Nuclear Society, June 20–24, 1993.
 Koen, B.V., “Creation of a Sense of ‘Presence’ in a Web-Based Course: The Search for Mark Hopkins’ Log in a Digital World,” Invited Paper for Special Issue of IEEE Transactions on Education on Web-Based Instruction, November, 2005, Vol. 48, No. 4, pp. 599-604.
For over forty years, Koen created, developed, and taught to engineering and non-engineering students the Theory of Engineering Design in terms of heuristics.  Representative publications:
 Koen, B.V., "Engineering Method," Ethics, Science, Technology, and Engineering: A Global Resource 2nd edition, J. Britt Holbrook and Carl Mitcham, editors, Farmington Hills, MI: Macmillan Reference, 2015. Vol. 2, pp. 90–92. 
 Koen, B.V., "Toward a Definition of the Engineering Method,"  Proceedings of the ASEE-IEEE Frontiers in Education Conference, Oct. 3-5, 1984, Philadelphia, Pa., pp. 544–549. (Won the Ben Dasher Best Paper Award for 1984.) 
 Koen, B.V., “The Engineering Method and Its Implications for Scientific, Philosophical, and Universal Methods,” The Monist, vol. 92, no. 3, essay 3, July 2009.
 Koen, B.V., “An Engineer’s Quest for Universal Method,” Norms, Knowledge, and Reasoning in Technology Conference, June 3–4, 2005, Boxmeer, The Netherlands, sponsored by the Philosophy and Ethics of Technology Department, Technical University of Eindhoven, Netherlands.

In popular culture 
Koen was the subject of "KOENTMND", a popular internet meme, or "fad", that prominently featured recordings of inspirational messages from Koen's lectures at The University of Texas at Austin. The meme gained popularity in 2006, after one of Koen's students posted an audio recording of him to YTMND, an internet meme community, saying, Can you believe it? You've already finished C. Do you think you can do MATLAB?According to the YTMND wiki, "KOENTMND" sites have "achieved high ratings, including some top viewed exposure." The meme has had many spinoffs.

Books

 Koen, Billy Vaughn, Discussion of the Method: Conducting  the Engineer’s Approach to Problem Solving, Oxford University Press, March, 2003.
 Koen, Billy V. and  Shimizu, Yasutaka, Heuristics for Internationally Distributed Collaboration Between Japan and the U.S.: A User’s Manual, 国 際 的 に 拡 充 さ れ た 共 同 活 動 の 体 得 則 実 践 者 マ ニ ュ ア ル Japan Industry and Management of Technology Program, The University of Texas at Austin, 2001.
 Koen, Billy V., El Método De Ingeniería, Universidad del Valle, Colombia, Presentacion a la Edicion Especial de ACOFI, September 19–22, 2000, Cartagena, Colombia.
 Koen, B.V., Definition of the Engineering Method, monograph of the American Society for Engineering Education, 1985. (Recipient of the ASEE Olmsted Award in 1987)

References

External links

 Billy Koen http://eric.ed.gov/?q=Billy+Koen
 Google Scholar Profile http://eric.ed.gov/?id=ED276572

1938 births
Living people
American nuclear engineers
University of Texas at Austin faculty